Valentyna Petrivna Kotyk (born 8 January 1978) is a Ukrainian football manager and a former player who played as a defender. She has been a member of the Ukraine women's national team.

Biography
Valentyna Kotyk is a Ukrainian female footballer and coach. Born in the village of Bely Kolodyaz in the Kharkiv Oblast, Valentyna grew up in the Poltava region and was involved in athletics from a young age. She showed an interest for sports from a young age and at the age of 16, she moved to a sports school in Zaporizhzhia to hone her skills. Three years later, she started playing football and joined the "Iskra" football club, later renamed as "Graphit".

In Russia, Valentyna played for Shakhty's "Don-Tex" for two years before moving on to the "Ryazan-TNK" club, which was the reigning champion of Russia and played in the Women's Champions League. Despite two seasons with the new team, Valentyna did not achieve much success and moved on to play for "Nadezhda" in Noginsk, before joining the Moscow "Spartak" and then returning back to Nadezhda.

Since 2007, Valentyna has been playing for the women's national football team of Ukraine, and has participated in the final part of the 2009 European Championship. She has also played for several other women's football clubs, including "Zorky" and "Mordovochka".

In 2013, Valentyna returned to Ukraine and continued playing for the Zhiflobud-1 sports club, where she won the championship three times in a row. After retiring as an active player in 2015, Valentyna received a coaching license of category "C" in February 2016, and category "B" in October of the same year. She became the head coach of Zhitlobud-1 FC in December 2017 and was recognized as the best coach of Ukraine in the same year.

Under her leadership, the Zhitlobud-1 FC won the championship and cup, making a golden double. Her team also made it to the group stage of the Champions League in 2017, but lost in the 1/16 finals to a Swedish team from "Linköping". In March 2019, Valentyna gave birth to a son.

Medals
  Champion of Ukraine (3): 2013, 2014, 2015
  Silver medalist Russian Championship (2): 2006 , 2011/12
  Bronze medalist Russian Championship (2): 2005 , 2007
  Winner of the Ukrainian Cup (3): 2013, 2014, 2015
  Finalist Russian Cup (2): 2006, 2011/12

As a coach 
 Champion of Ukraine (1):  2018
 Winner of the Ukrainian Cup (1): 2018

References

1978 births
Living people
Women's association football defenders
Female association football managers
Ukrainian women's footballers
Ukraine women's international footballers
Ukrainian football managers
WFC Zhytlobud-1 Kharkiv managers
WFC Zhytlobud-1 Kharkiv players
Ukrainian women's football managers
Ukrainian expatriate sportspeople in Russia
Sportspeople from Kharkiv Oblast